Cassidulus is a genus of echinoderms belonging to the family Cassidulidae.

The species of this genus are found in Europe, America and Africa.

Species:

Cassidulus abruptus 
Cassidulus amygdala 
Cassidulus briareus 
Cassidulus caribaearum 
Cassidulus conradi 
Cassidulus cubensis 
Cassidulus delectus 
Cassidulus emmonsi 
Cassidulus ericsoni 
Cassidulus evergladensis 
Cassidulus faberi 
Cassidulus globosus 
Cassidulus infidus 
Cassidulus kellumi 
Cassidulus kieri 
Cassidulus mercedensis 
Cassidulus mestieri 
Cassidulus mitis 
Cassidulus platypetalus 
Cassidulus rojasi 
Cassidulus santolayae 
Cassidulus senni 
Cassidulus sphaeroides 
Cassidulus taylori 
Cassidulus zanolettii

References

Cassidulidae
Echinoidea genera